The Man Behind the Badge  is a half-hour American television police drama series which aired on CBS from October 11, 1953, to October 3, 1954, originally hosted by Norman Rose. In its second syndicated season, the host became character actor Charles Bickford. Jerry Robinson was the producer. 

The CBS version was broadcast from 9:30 to 10 p.m. Eastern Time on Sundays. It replaced Arthur Murray Party and was replaced by Honestly, Celeste!. The sponsor was Bristol Myers. Everett Rosenthal was the executive producer, with Arthur Singer as director.

Beginning in January 1955, a filmed version of the program was syndicated to local stations by MCA TV.

In an interview with Kliph Nesteroff, assistant director Arthur Marks stated the filmed episodes were shot at the same time and on the same sets as Treasury Men in Action. Bernard J. Prockter produced the series in Hollywood.

Synopsis
The series is based on files from agencies of law enforcement. In addition to police, the subjects of episodes included judges, park rangers, parole officers, and public defenders. Topics of episodes included divorce, life in a boys' home, and rehabilitation.

Recurring roles and notable guest stars

Critical response
Dwight Newton, writing in the San Francisco Examiner, said that the first episode "had possibilities but fell apart at the themes." He mentioned transparent acting and too much use of narration in particular and referred to actors who "gesture like they did in the old silent movie days."

References

External links
  
 The Man Behind the Badge at CVTA with episode list

1950s American crime drama television series
1953 American television series debuts
1955 American television series endings
CBS original programming
Black-and-white American television shows
Television series by Universal Television
English-language television shows